Khatemeh is a documentary written and directed by two brothers, Mehdi and Hadi Zarei. It won the Best Director award for Full-length Documentary and the Best Editing award at the Iran International Documentary Film Festival, as well as the Best Feature Film at the Florence Film Awards.

Plot
The structure of Khatemeh's family, who originally came from Afghanistan and have been living in Shiraz, Iran, for more than thirty years, is rigid. A fourteen-year-old girl was married to a man double her age. He was in a relationship with her older sister, who took her own life. He says: “When she died, I wanted to marry her sister because they look alike.” According to the men in the house, mental problems are common to all the women in the family. Khatemeh has run away to a women's refuge because she couldn't stand it any longer. She asks for a divorce. Some male relatives go to the refuge to take Khatemeh away with them. Her brother says: “Death is better than being a whore.” At first glance, the situation seems clear. In the course of the film, however, more and more discrepancies emerge. Khatemeh shifts unpredictably between mental states. Sometimes she curses her family and fights for her freedom, then other times she implores the women who run the refuge on her knees to let her go home no matter what. Other girls, who also took refuge in the home, are sometimes attacked violently by her. “Khatemeh” is like a desert storm which obscures the viewer again and again, then reveals a new vista when it has died down.

Awards and nominations

References

External links
 

2019 films
Persian-language films
Pashto-language films
Films set in Iran
Iranian documentary films
Documentary films about women
Documentary films about children
Documentary films about Iran
Documentary films about human rights